Elections to City of Bradford Metropolitan District Council were held on 1 May 1975, with one third of the seats up for election. The election resulted in the Conservatives retaining control. Voter turnout was 34.0%.

Election result

This result had the following consequences for the total number of seats on the council after the elections:

Ward results

References

1975 English local elections
1975
1970s in West Yorkshire